Dennis Jonathan Alas Morales (born 10 January 1985 in San Salvador) is a Salvadoran former association football player. He was banned for life in 2013, for match fixing while playing for the El Salvador national football team.

He is the older brother of El Salvador national team member Jaime Alas.

Club career
Nicknamed Pitbull, Alas came through the youth ranks at Academia La Chelona and joined San Salvador F.C. in 2001.

After sparking interest with his Gold Cup performance, Alas trained with MLS club CD Chivas USA in contemplation of a potential move there. Nothing came of this and he return to El Salvador. On December 27, 2007, it was announced that Dennis Alas had signed a one-year contract with USL-2 side Real Maryland F.C. On July 14, 2008, it was announced by Real Maryland F.C. have terminated Dennis Alas’ contract by mutual consent with the player. The Salvadoran international played a total of 14 games and scored 3 goals and was also selected to the USL-2 team of the week twice including a USL-2 Player of the Week honor for his two-goal performance in the 3-2 win over Cleveland. The Salvadoran was on loan to Real Maryland from his former club San Salvador F.C.

Due to a clause in his contract he became free when the capital club was relegated to El Salvador’s second division. Alas jumped at the chance to join Salvadoran champions C.D. Luís Ángel Firpo.

In September 2014, thanks to the Football Superleague of Kosovo not being recognised by FIFA, Alas joined KF Feronikeli. His fellow banned Salvadoran teammates Cristian Castillo and José Henríquez joined Zeravani SC in the Kurdish Premier League, a league also not recognised by FIFA, while Ramón Sánchez subsequently joined Zakho FC of the same league.

International career
Alas made his debut for El Salvador in an October 2001 friendly match against Mexico and has, as of August 2011, earned a total of 63 caps, scoring 3 goals. He has represented his country in 7 FIFA World Cup qualification matches and played at several UNCAF Cups as well as at the 2007 and 2009 and 2011 CONCACAF Gold Cups.

On the night of June 7, 2007, he scored the game-winning goal against Trinidad and Tobago to give El Salvador their first win of their 2007 Gold Cup campaign. That night, Alas was named by Univision as the Miller Light Player Of The Match.

On September 20, 2013, Alas was one of 14 Salvadoran players banned for life due to their involvement with match fixing.

International goals
Scores and results list El Salvador's goal tally first.

References

External links
 
 Fan Website Profile 
 El Grafico Profile 
 Profile - La Furia Pampera

1985 births
Living people
Sportspeople from San Salvador
Association football midfielders
Salvadoran footballers
El Salvador international footballers
2003 UNCAF Nations Cup players
2005 UNCAF Nations Cup players
2007 UNCAF Nations Cup players
2007 CONCACAF Gold Cup players
2009 CONCACAF Gold Cup players
2011 Copa Centroamericana players
2011 CONCACAF Gold Cup players
San Salvador F.C. footballers
Real Maryland F.C. players
USL Second Division players
C.D. Luis Ángel Firpo footballers
Expatriate soccer players in the United States
Expatriate footballers in Kosovo
Salvadoran expatriate footballers
Sportspeople involved in betting scandals
Sportspeople banned for life